Abanoz is a yayla (summer resort) in Mersin Province, Turkey

Geography 
Abanoz is actually a part of Çukurabanoz village of Anamur district in Mersin Province. It has no settled population but hosts visitors during summers. It is on the Taurus Mountains and distance to Anamur is

Etymology and the history 
The name Abanoz in Turkish means the tree ebony  (Diospyros ebenum) referring to the trees around the yayla.  There are traces of human habitation of ancient ages. But the yayla culture dates back to Turkmen nomads after the 12th century. Abanoz had never been a permanent settlement. It was a summer camp of nomads for pasturing. However beginning by 20th century it is also a summer resort of people from Anamur and other cities which are hot during the summer.

References

Yaylas in Turkey
Populated places in Anamur District